Germknödel ( in Austrian German) is a fluffy yeast dough dumpling (knödel), filled with spiced plum jam and served with melted butter and a mix of poppy seeds and sugar on top. It is occasionally – even though less traditional – served with vanilla cream sauce instead. It is a culinary specialty of Austria and Bavaria. The dish is served both as a dessert and as a main course.

Germknödel is usually a spherical or bun-shaped dessert. The dessert's main ingredient is a yeast dough enriched with sugar and fat, usually butter. The dumpling is filled with Powidl, a sweet plum jam flavoured with cloves and cinnamon. The dumpling is steamed and then served while still hot with either melted butter or vanilla sauce, and topped with crushed poppy seeds and sugar.

Differences between Austrian  ( being the exclusively Austrian word for yeast) and the very similar German and Alsacian dish, Dampfnudel, are that Dampfnudeln are the unfilled variant and can in some regions also be steamed or boiled in salt water and served with savoury side dishes, whereas Bavarian Dampfnudeln and Austrian Germknödel are steamed (and in the end of the cooking process, as the milk has evaporated, become lightly fried) in a small amount of a mixture of milk and butter and always served as a sweet meal.

See also
 List of steamed foods

References 

 Erhard Spacek, Neue böhmische Küche: ...und Weine aus Böhmen und Mähren. 2005.

External links 

 Traditional Austrian Germknödel with Powidl

Austrian desserts
Ashkenazi Jewish cuisine
Jewish desserts
Jewish baked goods
Sweet breads
Yeast breads
Poppy seeds
Dumplings
Plum dishes
Steamed foods
Stuffed desserts
Foods with jam